Scott Cooper (born April 20, 1970) is an American director, screenwriter, producer and actor. He is known for writing and directing Crazy Heart (2009), Out of the Furnace (2013), Black Mass (2015), and Hostiles (2017).

Early life
Cooper was born in Abingdon, Virginia. He is a 1988 graduate of Abingdon High School. Cooper trained as an actor at Lee Strasberg Theatre and Film Institute in New York City. He received both his undergraduate degree in 1992 and his Doctor of Humane Letters in 2014 from Hampden–Sydney College in Hampden Sydney, Virginia.

Career
Cooper spent a decade working as an actor in film and television.

He made the switch to directing with 2009's Crazy Heart, starring Jeff Bridges and Maggie Gyllenhaal. The film, released by Fox Searchlight Pictures, received widespread critical acclaim and a number of accolades, including the Academy Awards for Best Actor (Bridges) and Best Original Song.

Among Crazy Heart's fans were director Ridley Scott and producer Michael Costigan, as well as executives at Leonardo DiCaprio's production company, Appian Way. Cooper was offered the opportunity to develop The Low Dweller, a spec script written by Brad Ingelsby that had DiCaprio and Scott attached, as actor and director respectively. Cooper rewrote the script, drawing on his experience of growing up in Appalachia and losing a sibling at a young age.

Relativity Media put the film, now titled Out of the Furnace, into production in 2012, with Christian Bale, Woody Harrelson and Casey Affleck leading the ensemble cast. Cooper directed the film, and shared writing credit with Ingelsby. DiCaprio and Scott remained as producers.

In January 2014, Cooper became attached to rewrite and direct Black Mass, a crime drama based the book of the same name by Dick Lehr and Gerard O'Neill, described as the "true story of Billy Bulger, Whitey Bulger, FBI agent John Connolly and the FBI's witness protection program that was created by J. Edgar Hoover." Barry Levinson had previously been involved with the project. Johnny Depp, who had been on and off the project for a number of years, came back on board to play the infamous Boston crime boss Whitey Bulger, alongside Joel Edgerton as Connolly and Benedict Cumberbatch as Billy Bulger. The film was released in 2015. In 2016, he sold his home in Brentwood for $3.6 million and it was widely covered in the media.

Cooper wrote, directed and produced the 2017 western Hostiles, based on a decades old manuscript by the late screenwriter Donald E. Stewart. The film reteamed Cooper with his Out of the Furnace star, Bale, alongside Rosamund Pike. It had its world premiere at the Telluride Film Festival, with US distribution rights picked up by Entertainment Studios Motion Pictures. Cooper's next film was the supernatural horror story Antlers, starring Keri Russell and Jesse Plemons and co-produced by Guillermo del Toro, which was released in 2021.

In 2019, actor Christian Bale announced that Cooper will direct his upcoming Valhalla, which Joel Edgerton might star in, as well as the film adaptation of Jess Walter’s Over Tumbled Graves. He has also started a scholarship program for students to access high-quality education in the US and Canada colleges.

Influences
Thomas Wolfe and William Faulkner are literary influences.

Films that have influenced Cooper include: Robert Altman's Nashville, Terrence Malick's Badlands, John Huston's Fat City and Peter Bogdanovich's The Last Picture Show.

His principal film-making mentor has been veteran actor, producer and director, Robert Duvall. He and Duvall met on the set of Gods and Generals and struck up a friendship. Cooper was married on Duvall's  Virginia estate. The two appeared together in Broken Trail and Get Low, and Duvall produced and appeared in Cooper's film Crazy Heart, along with an appearance in The Pale Blue Eye.

Personal life 
Cooper is married and lives in Los Angeles with his wife, Jocelyne Cooper, and their son Aria and two daughters, Ava and Stella.

Filmography

Acting roles 
Film

Television

Awards and nominations
Nominated for Most Promising Director for Crazy Heart at CFCA Award 2009
Nominated for Best Screenplay for Crazy Heart at 2010 Independent Spirit Awards
Nominated for Best Screenplay for Crazy Heart at 2010 Writers Guild of America Awards

References

External links

L.A. Times Blogs: "The Body and Soul Behind Crazy Heart"

American male film actors
Film producers from California
American male screenwriters
American male television actors
Living people
1970 births
People from Abingdon, Virginia
Hampden–Sydney College alumni
Male actors from Los Angeles
Lee Strasberg Theatre and Film Institute alumni
Film directors from Virginia
Film directors from California
Male actors from Virginia
20th-century American male actors
21st-century American male actors
Screenwriters from Virginia
Screenwriters from California